Luther W. New Jr. Theological College, known as NTC, is a private, accredited Christian seminary in Dehra Dun, India. It was founded in 1989 by George Kuruvila Chavanikamannil. It trains grass-root level Christian workers as well as advanced Christian leadership and theological training.

New Theological College is affiliated with the Senate of Serampore and accredited by Asia Theological Association. It offers certificate, diploma, bachelor and master degrees in addition to some basic evangelism courses. MTh programme in Biblical studies and Theology began in June 2011. Courses are offered in Hindi, and English. NTC also has a school of Music in addition to the Theology school.

The college publishes the Doon Theological Journal.

References

External links
Official Web site

Christian seminaries and theological colleges in India
Universities and colleges in Dehradun
Educational institutions established in 1989
1989 establishments in Uttar Pradesh